Doryaspis (from   'spear' and   'shield') (also known by its synonym, "Lyktaspis") is an extinct genus of primitive jawless fish that lived in the Devonian period. Fossils have been discovered in Spitsbergen.

The animals had canteen-shaped body armor and had large branchial plates that extended out and curved downward in a triangular shape, very similar to those of the pycnosteids.  An element of the median oral plates (that would correspond to the lower lip or chin in gnathostomes) extends out in a long rod-shaped appendage, called the "pseudorostrum." The tail is long and slender and has large rows of thick scales.

In the type species, D. nathorsti, the lateral edges of the branchial plates and of the pseudorostrum are serrated. The second species, D. arctica, is smaller, and lacks serrated edges.

Palaeoecology 
Due to its unusual form, its ecology is debated. There are two hypotheses about lifestyle, to make it a surface pelagic swimmer or a benthic burrower. For pelagic lifestyle, it mostly used its caudal fin to move. Fin-shaped plates may had effect of levitation by increasing the bearing surface of it. Water flows ejected by their gill openings may worked to stabilize and control lateral movements. On the other hand, benthic burrowing hypothesis is supported by its flat dorsal disc. Moving half-buried in the sediments allows it to filter nutrient particles. However, burrowing theory have problem, because gill openings are placed lower part of body, risking suffocation. Thus study in 2005 concluded that pelagic theory is more supported than burrowing theory. However, several papers have incorrectly cited this study as supporting burrowing ecology.

References 

 THE GENUS DORYASPIS WHITE (HETEROSTRACI) FROM THE LOWER DEVONIAN OF VESTSPITSBERGEN, SVALBARD 
 Long, John A. The Rise of Fishes: 500 Million Years of Evolution, Baltimore: The Johns Hopkins University Press, 1996.  

Devonian jawless fish
Pteraspidiformes genera
Early Devonian fish of Europe
Fossil taxa described in 1935